Mechanics of Dysfunction is the debut studio album by Canadian death metal band Beneath the Massacre. It was released on February 20, 2007 through Prosthetic Records.

It was produced by Despised Icon guitarist Yannick St-Ammand.

Track listing

Personnel
Beneath the Massacre
 Dennis Bradley − bass guitar
 Justin Rousselle − drums
 Christopher Bradley − guitar
 Elliot Desgagnés − vocals

Productions
 Yannick St-Ammand − producing and audio recording
 Alan Douches − audio mastering
 Pierre Rémillard − audio mixing

References

2007 debut albums
Beneath the Massacre albums
Prosthetic Records albums